The Royal College of Surgeons of England (RCS England) is an independent professional body and registered charity that promotes and advances standards of surgical care for patients, and regulates surgery and dentistry in England and Wales. The college is located at Lincoln's Inn Fields in London. It publishes multiple medical journals including the Annals of the Royal College of Surgeons of England, the Faculty Dental Journal, and the Bulletin of the Royal College of Surgeons of England.

History

The origins of the college date to the fourteenth century with the foundation of the "Guild of Surgeons Within the City of London". Certain sources date this as occurring in 1368. There was an ongoing dispute between the surgeons and barber surgeons until an agreement was signed between them in 1493, giving the fellowship of surgeons the power of incorporation. This union was formalised further in 1540 by Henry VIII between the Worshipful Company of Barbers (incorporated 1462) and the Guild of Surgeons to form the Company of Barber-Surgeons. In 1745 the surgeons broke away from the barbers to form the Company of Surgeons. In 1800 the company was granted a royal charter to become the Royal College of Surgeons in London. A further charter in 1843 granted it the present title of the Royal College of Surgeons of England.

Members and Fellows of the College
The correct way to address a member or fellow of the Royal College of Surgeons is to use the title Mr, Miss, Mrs, Ms, or Mx (not Dr). This system (which applies only to surgeons, not physicians) has its origins in the 16th century, when surgeons were barber-surgeons and did not have a medical degree (or indeed any formal qualification), unlike physicians, who, by the 18th century, held a university medical degree and could thus be referred to as "Doctor". 

By the time the College of Surgeons received its royal charter in 1800, the Royal College of Physicians were insisting that candidates for membership of the College of Surgeons must first have a medical degree. Therefore, the ensuing years saw aspiring surgeons having to study medicine first and hence receive the title 'doctor'. Thereafter, having obtained the diploma of Member or Fellow of the Royal College of Surgeons he would revert to the title "Mr" as a snub to the RCP. Nowadays the title "Mr" is used by Members of the college who have passed the diploma MRCS examination and the college addresses Members as "Mr" or "Ms".

In Sir Arthur Conan Doyle's The Hound of the Baskervilles, the distinction is made in the following conversation:

Despite Mortimer's correction, he is referred to as "Dr. Mortimer" throughout the story.

A biographical register of fellows is available on Plarr's Lives of the Fellows Online

Buildings
The Company of Surgeons moved from Surgeon's Hall in Old Bailey to a site at 41 Lincoln's Inn Fields in 1797. The British government presented the collection of John Hunter to the surgeons after acquiring it in 1799, and in 1803 the company purchased the adjoining house at 42 Lincoln's Inn Fields to house the collection, which forms the basis of The Hunterian Museum. 

Construction of the first College building, to a design by George Dance the Younger, and James Lewis, took place on this site from 1805 to 1813. The company soon outgrew these premises and in 1834 No. 40, Lincoln's Inn Fields was acquired and demolished along with the George Dance building, of which only a portion of the portico was retained. Sir Charles Barry won the public competition to design a replacement, constructing a facade largely of artificial stone composed of cast blocks of concrete and stucco. Barry extended this building southwards following the acquisition of Copeland's Warehouse on Portugal Street, and the enlarged buildings opened in 1855.

The college buildings expanded to their current extent between 1888 & 1889, when additional wings were constructed on the sites of numbers 39 & 43 Lincoln's Inn Fields and two storeys were added to the Charles Barry Building by the architect Stephen Salter (b.1826, d.1896).

In 1941 a German incendiary bomb hit the college causing extensive damage that necessitated major rebuilding during the 1950s and 60s. The surviving portion of the earlier buildings were listed Grade II* on 24 February 1958.

Planning consent for a major rebuilding of the non-listed buildings of the Royal College of Surgeons was granted by Westminster City Council in January 2017. The redevelopment of building has been designed by the architecture practice Hawkins\Brown. Barry's famous north frontage and library will be preserved and restored and The Hunterian Museum will benefit from a new façade and entrance on Portugal Street, to the south of the site. A "topping out" ceremony for the new buildings was celebrated on 24 January 2020, but, as of January 2021, the buildings have not re-opened to the public.

The exterior of the building was one of the filming locations of Agatha Christie's Poirot episode The Mystery of the Spanish Chest.

Hunterian Museum

In 1799 the government purchased the collection of John Hunter which they presented to the college. This formed the basis of the Hunterian Collection, which has since been supplemented by others including an Odontological Collection (curated by A. E. W. Miles until the early 1990s) and the natural history collections of Richard Owen.

The Hunterian Museum is a member of The London Museums of Health & Medicine group, and displays thousands of anatomical specimens, including the Evelyn tables and the skeleton of the "Irish giant" Charles Byrne, surgical instruments, and paintings and sculptures about medical individuals and medicine.

Faculties
 Faculty of Dental Surgery
 Faculty of General Dental Practice
 Faculty of Anaesthetists (until 1988, now the Royal College of Anaesthetists)

Medals, awards and lectures
The Cheselden Medal was instituted in 2009 in honour of William Cheselden "to recognise unique achievements in, and exceptional contributions to, the advancement of surgery". The award is made at irregular intervals to reflect the outstanding qualities required of recipients and is deemed one of the college's highest professional honours.

The Royal Colleges' Bronze Medal was instituted in 1957 and is awarded jointly with the Royal College of Physicians and the Royal College of Obstetricians and Gynaecologists. It is awarded annually "on the nomination of the Medical Group of the Royal Photographic Society for the outstanding example of photography in the service of medicine and surgery".

The Wood Jones Medal was instituted in 1975 to commemorate Frederic Wood Jones (Sir William Collins Professor of Human and Comparative Anatomy and Conservator of the Anatomy Museum 1945–52). It is awarded occasionally (triennially until 1994) by a Committee "for contributions to anatomical knowledge or the teaching of anatomy in the tradition of Frederic Wood Jones".

The Clement-Price Award was founded in 1958 with a gift of 1,000 guineas from members of the staff of the Westminster Hospital in honour of Sir Clement Price Thomas. It is awarded triennially, or at such other interval as the President may decide, by the council on the recommendation of the Fellowship Election and Prize Committee, "in recognition of meritorious contributions to surgery in its widest sense, without restriction of candidature".

The Lister Medal has been awarded since 1924 (mostly on a triennial basis), after the college was entrusted in 1920 with administrating the Lister Memorial Fund, in memory of pioneering British surgeon Joseph Lister. The award is decided in conjunction with the Royal Society, the Royal College of Surgeons in Ireland, the University of Edinburgh, and the University of Glasgow. In addition to being presented with a medal, the recipient delivers the Lister Oration at the college.

The Honorary Gold Medal was instituted in 1802 and is awarded at irregular intervals "for liberal acts or distinguished labours, researches and discoveries eminently conducive to the improvement of natural knowledge and of the healing art". Recipients to date include Sir Victor Negus, Sir Geoffrey Keynes, Sir Stanford Cade (all three in 1969), Professor Harold Ellis (1998), Professor Sir Alec Jeffreys (2002) and Dr Barry J. Marshall (2005).

The Bradshaw Lecture was founded in 1875 under the will of Mrs Sally Hall Bradshaw in memory of her husband, Dr William Wood Bradshaw. It is a biennial (annual until 1993) lecture on surgery, customarily given by a senior member of the council on or about the day preceding the second Thursday of December. (Given in alternate years, with the Hunterian Oration given in the intervening years). Not to be confused with the corresponding Bradshaw Lectures delivered to the Royal College of Physicians. See Bradshaw Lecture for list of past lectures and lecturers.

The Hunterian Oration was founded in 1853 when a bequest was made by the executors of John Hunter's will, to provide for an annual dinner and oration in memory of the famous surgeon. It is now delivered biennially.

Educational history
Prior to 1820, to meet the requirements of London's College of  Surgeons, students would spend time in London and select courses of instruction in surgery by teachers at Guy's Hospital, St Thomas' – together known as London's Borough Hospitals – and as well as attend anatomy classes at private institutions such as William Hunter's anatomy school, attached  for a time to Middlesex Hospital. Although at this time some students of surgery had already acquired the M.D. (or its equivalent) qualification, it was not until the 1830s that students of surgery were required to have obtained a medical degree at a university before commencing studies for membership of the Royal College of Surgeons. By the 1830s, medical schools in London at the University of London, St George's Hospital and King's College, London had been established and the influence of the private schools was diminished.

Today, the RCS offers a range of both on-line e-learning modules and hands-on practical workshops to facilitate the CPD for trainee and consultant surgeons across varies specialties.

Since May 2017, the RCS started to offer a Postgraduate Certificate in Surgery to junior surgical trainees. This qualification combined e-learning modules and practical causes "offer surgical trainees a high-quality, flexible and interactive way to build their surgical knowledge and skills" across different surgical specialties.

Current and past Presidents

Past Masters - Royal College of Surgeons

Past Masters - Company of Surgeons

See also
 Hunterian Oration
 Royal College of Surgeons of Edinburgh
 Royal College of Surgeons in Ireland
 Association of Surgeons in Training
 Royal College of Physicians and Surgeons of Glasgow
 Definitive Surgical Trauma Skills

References

External links 

 
 Hunterian Museum and Wellcome Museum website
 Plarr's Lives of the Fellows Online
 London Museums of Health and Medicine

 
1745 establishments in England
Dental organisations based in the United Kingdom
Surgeons
Surgeons of England
Surgical organisations based in the United Kingdom
Buildings and structures in the City of Westminster
College of Surgeons
Organisations based in the City of Westminster
14th-century establishments in England
Learned societies of the United Kingdom
Charles Barry buildings